Easterday is an unincorporated community located in Carroll County, Kentucky, United States. Its post office is closed.

References

Unincorporated communities in Carroll County, Kentucky
Unincorporated communities in Kentucky